The Municipal Hall of Forest is the municipal hall building and the seat of that municipality of Brussels, Belgium. Built between 1935 and 1938, and qualified as a prototype of Brussels' Art Deco, this building illustrates the leading role the style played in public architecture during the interwar period.

History

Inception and construction
In the aftermath of World War I, the municipal authorities of Forest wanted to build a municipal hall representative of its status as a flourishing suburb of Brussels. It was originally planned to build it on the site of the current Royale Union Saint-Gilloise Stadium in the Duden Park district but, after much discussion, it was decided to erect it instead on the grounds of the previous Municipal Hall, a neoclassical building dating from 1828, and in the place of a previous parsonage from 1734.

The current Municipal Hall was designed by the architect  in 1925, and the municipal council approved the final plans in 1931. The first stone was officially laid on 19 May 1935 and the building was inaugurated on 9 July 1938. The building has important interior and exterior decorations made by such artists as Victor Rousseau, Georges Baltus, Canneel, Stoffyn and Tricot.

Damage and protection
During World War II, the Municipal Hall suffered from bombings in Forest that lead to serious damage to the facade and the entrance portal to the /.

On 22 October 1992, the exterior, interior and furniture of the building were classified as protected cultural monuments by the Royal Commission for Monuments and Landscapes. Forest's Municipal Hall is also on the list of protected immovable heritage monuments of the Department of Monuments and Landscapes of the Brussels-Capital Region.

Architecture
The asymmetrical Municipal Hall has a sleek geometric design with a tower on the side. The facades are made of small orange bricks and are adorned with stylised statues.

Tower
The building is dominated by the tall silhouette of the tower, symbol of municipal freedoms and the independence of municipal power from the clergy. Placed asymmetrically with respect to the main building, this multi-storey tower is adorned with large copper-sheeted statues. They are gilded with gold leaf and are the work of the sculptors Jacques Marin and Marnix d'Haveloose.

Portals
The main portal, located on the /, facing the park and at the foot of the tower, is made of blue stone. It gives access to the Wedding Room, located on the ground floor, and to a monumental staircase of black, grey and white marble which leads to the Municipal Council Room. The second portal, located on the right side of the building, on the /, is smaller and gives access to the ticket and administrative offices. The capitals of the portals' pillars are decorated with bas-reliefs that evoke family life and local trades such as brewing, laundry or shoemaking.

Facades
Combining orange brick and blue stone, the facades have numerous brick pilasters whose blue stone capitals are adorned with masks from Greek tragedy or the mouths of animals (e.g. fish, felines) from which sometimes emerge drain pipes. The facades have many stepped gables, the largest of which bear representations of a pelican and a seahorse.

See also

 Anderlecht Municipal Hall
 Brussels Town Hall

References

Notes

Bibliography
 
 

Buildings and structures in Brussels
City and town halls in Belgium
Forest, Belgium
Protected heritage sites in Brussels
Art Deco architecture in Belgium